Meat Loaf’s Neverland Express was the rotating backing band for the late American singer Meat Loaf.

Band lineups

1977–78 (Bat Out of Hell)
 Bob Kulick: lead guitars
 Bruce Kulick: guitars
 Steve Buslowe: bass, vocals
 Jim Steinman: piano, vocals
 Paul Glanz: keyboards, vocals
 Joe Stefko: drums
 Karla DeVito: female lead vocals
 Rory Dodd: vocals

1981–82

Dead Ringer
 Davey Johnstone: lead guitars
 Mark Doyle: guitars
 Steve Buslowe: bass, vocals
 Paul Jacobs: piano, vocals
 George Meyer: keyboards, vocals
 Terry Williams: drums
 Pamela Moore: female lead vocals 
 Ted Neeley: vocals
 Eric Troyer: vocals

European Tour
 Mark Doyle: lead guitars
 Steve Hunter: guitars
 Steve Buslowe: bass, vocals
 Paul Jacobs: piano, vocals
 George Meyer: keyboards, vocals
 Terry Williams: drums
 Pamela Moore: female lead vocals
 Ted Neeley: vocals
 Eric Troyer: vocals

Note: George Borowski was the guitar tech during the '81/'82 period, but often played with the band onstage, especially during encores. By the end of the tour, he had become the opening act.

1983 (Midnight at the Lost and Found)
 Bob Kulick: lead guitars
 Mark Doyle: guitars
 Steve Buslowe: bass, vocals
 Paul Jacobs: piano, vocals
 Wells Kelly: drums
 Kati Mac: female lead vocals

1984–85 (Bad Attitude)
 Bob Kulick: lead guitars
 Paul Jacobs: guitars, piano, vocals
 John Golden: bass, vocals
 Brian Chatton: keyboards, vocals
 Andy Wells: drums
 Kati Mac: female lead vocals
 Doreen Chanter: vocals

1986–88

20/20 World Tour [Blind Before I Stop] (1986-87)
 Bob Kulick: lead guitars
 Alan Merrill: guitars, vocals
 Steve Buslowe: bass, vocals
 Frank Doyle: keyboards
 Chuck Burgi: drums
 Amy Goff: female lead vocals
 Elaine Goff: vocals

Lost Boys and Golden Girls / Bat Out of Hell 10th Anniversary Tour (1988)
 Bob Kulick: lead guitars
 Alan Merrill: guitars, vocals
 Steve Buslowe: bass, vocals
 Domenic Cicchetti: keyboards
 Chuck Burgi: drums
 Amy Goff: female lead vocals
 Elaine Goff: vocals

Note: At one point in the 1988 tour, Stevie Lange filled in for one of the Goff sisters.

Pubs and Clubs 1989-1991

Bandmembers
 guitars: Pat Thrall, Dave Gellis
 bass: Steve Buslowe
 piano: Mark Alexander
 keyboards: Mark Alexander, "Dominic Chichetti" (sic)
 drums: Chuck Burgi, John Miceli
 vocals: Amy Goff, Elaine Goff, "Patricia Rousseau" (sic)

Note: Paul Jacobs played piano at some rehearsals in 1989.

1993–97

Everything Louder Tour (1993-94)
 Pat Thrall: lead guitars, vocals
 Kasim Sulton: guitars, keyboards, vocals
 Steve Buslowe: bass, vocals
 Mark Alexander : piano, vocals
 John Miceli: drums
 Patti Russo: female lead vocals
 Pearl Aday: vocals (summer of 1994 only)

Born to Rock Tour (1995-96)
 Pat Thrall: lead guitars, vocals
 Kasim Sulton: guitars, keyboards, vocals
 Steve Buslowe: bass, vocals
 Mark Alexander: piano, vocals
 John Miceli: drums
 Patti Russo: female lead vocals
 Pearl Aday: vocals

German Festival Tour (1997)
 Pat Thrall: lead guitars, vocals
 Kasim Sulton: guitars, keyboards, vocals
 Steve Buslowe: bass, vocals
 Mark Alexander: piano, vocals
 John Miceli: drums
 Patti Russo: female lead vocals

1998–2000
 Damon La Scot: lead guitars
 Ray Andersen: guitars, keyboards, vocals
 Kasim Sulton: bass, vocals
 Tom Brislin: piano, vocals
 John Miceli: drums
 Patti Russo: female lead vocals
 Pearl Aday: vocals

Night of the Proms 2001
 Kasim Sulton: bass, vocals
 Mark Alexander: piano, vocals
 John Miceli: drums
 Patti Russo: female lead vocals
 Pearl Aday: vocals

2002
 Damon La Scot: lead guitars
 John Golden: guitars, keyboards, vocals
 Kasim Sulton: bass, vocals
 Mark Alexander: piano, vocals
 John Miceli: drums
 Patti Russo: female lead vocals
 Pearl Aday: vocals

Couldn’t Have Said It Better 2003–04

Concerts in Germany and Amsterdam
 Paul Crook: lead guitars
 John Golden: guitars, keyboards, vocals
 Kasim Sulton: bass, vocals
 Mark Alexander: piano, vocals
 John Miceli: drums
 Patti Russo: female lead vocals
 Pearl Aday: vocals (in Germany only)
 Sara Douglas: vocals (in Amsterdam only)

2003-04 Australian Tour
 Paul Crook: lead guitars
 Randy Flowers: guitars, keyboards, vocals
 Kasim Sulton: bass, vocals
 Mark Alexander: piano, vocals
 John Miceli: drums
 Patti Russo: female lead vocals
 Renee Cologne: vocals

Note: Carolyn ‘C.C’ Colleti-Jablonski joined the band through mid-2003.

2005–06
 Paul Crook: lead guitars
 Randy Flowers: guitars, keyboards, vocals
 Kasim Sulton: bass, vocals
 Mark Alexander: piano, vocals
 John Miceli: drums
 Patti Russo: female lead vocals
 Carolyn "C.C." Coletti–Jablonski: vocals

Seize the Night (3 Bats Live) 2007
 Paul Crook: lead guitars
 Randy Flowers: guitars, vocals
 Kasim Sulton: bass, vocals
 Mark Alexander: piano, vocals
 Dave Luther: saxophones, keyboards, vocals
 John Miceli: drums
 Aspen Miller: female lead vocals
 Carolyn "C.C." Coletti–Jablonski: vocals

2008 (Casa de Carne Tour)
 Paul Crook: lead guitars
 Randy Flowers: guitars, vocals
 Kasim Sulton: bass, vocals
 Mark Alexander: piano, vocals
 Dave Luther: saxophones, keyboards, vocals
 John Miceli: drums
 Patti Russo: female lead vocals
 Carolyn "C.C." Coletti–Jablonski: vocals

2010–2013

Hang Cool Tour (June–December 2010) 
 Paul Crook: lead guitars
 Randy Flowers: guitars, vocals
 Danny Miranda: bass, vocals
 Justin Avery: piano, vocals
 Dave Luther: saxophones, keyboards, vocals
 John Miceli: drums
 Patti Russo: female lead vocals
 Carolyn "C.C." Coletti–Jablonski: vocals

Hell in a Handbasket

Guilty Pleasure Tour (October 2011)
 Paul Crook: lead guitars
 Randy Flowers: guitars, vocals
 Danny Miranda: bass, vocals
 Justin Avery: piano, vocals
 Dave Luther: saxophones, keyboards, vocals
 Ginny Luke: violin, vocals
 John Miceli: drums
 Patti Russo: female lead vocals

Mad, Mad World/Last At Bat Tour (2012-13)
 Paul Crook: lead guitars
 Randy Flowers: guitars, vocals
 Danny Miranda: bass, vocals
 Justin Avery: piano, vocals
 Dave Luther: saxophones, keyboards, vocals
 John Miceli: drums
 Patti Russo: female lead vocals

2013–2014
 Paul Crook: lead guitars
 Randy Flowers: guitars, vocals
 Danny Miranda: bass, vocals
 Tish Diaz: piano, vocals
 Dave Luther: saxophones, keyboards, vocals
 John Miceli: drums
 Lyssa Lynne: vocals
 Stacy Michelle: vocals

2015–16 (in concert)
 Paul Crook: lead guitars
 Randy Flowers: guitars, vocals
 Danny Miranda: bass, vocals
 Justin Avery: piano, vocals
 Dave Luther: saxophones, keyboards, vocals
 John Miceli: drums
 Cian Coey: vocals

2021-present
 Caleb Johnson: lead vocals
 Paul Crook: lead guitars
 Randy Flowers: guitars, vocals
 Dave Luther: saxophone
 Andy Ascolese: piano
 Kiley Faith Baxter: vocals
 Lyssa Lynne: female lead vocals
 Danny Miranda: bass, vocals
 Joe Libretti: keyboards, vocals
 John Micelli: drums

References

1977 establishments in the United States
2022 disestablishments in the United States
Neverland Express
 
Meat Loaf
Musical groups established in 1977
Musical groups disestablished in 2022